Elvasia is a Neotropical genus of plant of family Ochnaceae. It is the only genus of tribe Elvasieae.

External links
Elvasia information from NPGS/GRIN

Ochnaceae
Malpighiales genera